The 1957 Northwest Territories general election was held on August 19, 1957.

Appointed members

Elected members
For complete electoral history, see individual districts

References
 Annual Report of the Commissioner of the Northwest Territories 1958

Elections in the Northwest Territories
1957 elections in Canada
20th century in the Northwest Territories
August 1957 events in Canada
1957 in the Northwest Territories